Amandine Mauricette (born 1 June 1985) is a French female former volleyball player, playing as an opposite. She was part of the France women's national volleyball team.

She competed at the 2009 Women's European Volleyball Championship. On club level she played for Vennelles VB in 2009.

References

External links
 
http://www.gettyimages.com/photos/amandine-mauricette?editorialproducts=sport&family=editorial&phrase=Amandine%20Mauricette&excludenudity=true&sort=mostpopular#license

1985 births
Living people
French women's volleyball players
Place of birth missing (living people)